William D. Phillips Log Cabin is a historic site near Hogansville, Georgia, located in Meriwether County.  It was built by William D. Phillips (1768-1849) for his family.  The original log cabin is no longer standing. It was added to the National Register of Historic Places on June 28, 1982. It is located on Georgia State Route 54.

It was listed on the National Register as a rare log cabin of its era, which have not often survived in Georgia.

See also
National Register of Historic Places listings in Meriwether County, Georgia

References

Log cabins in the United States
Houses in Meriwether County, Georgia
Houses on the National Register of Historic Places in Georgia (U.S. state)
Houses completed in 1903